Edward Jennings may refer to:

Edward Jennings (VC) (1820–1889), Irish recipient of the Victoria Cross
Edward Jennings (rowing) (1898–1975), American coxswain
Ned I.R. Jennings (1898–1929), American painter and set designer
Edward H. Jennings (1937–2019), president of Ohio State University
Edward Jennings (MP) (c. 1647–1725), English politician, MP for East Looe 1713–15
Ed Jennings (born 1968), Florida politician